Toki wo Koe Sora wo Koe / Password is 0 (Japanese 『時空を超え 宇宙を超え／Password is 0』) is Morning Musume's 56th single, and the second to be released under the name of Morning Musume '14. It was released on April 16, 2014 in 6 editions: 2 regular and 4 limited editions.

Both "Password is 0" and "Password is 0 (Morimusu Ver.)" were used for the au(KDDI) Spring 2014 commercial campaign featuring Morimusu.

Track list

CD (regular editions A and B, limited edition D)
Toki wo Koe Sora wo Koe
Password is 0
Password is 0 (Morimusu Ver.) – Morimusu
Toki wo Koe Sora wo Koe (instrumental)
Password is 0 (instrumental)

CD (limited editions A, B, C)
Toki wo Koe Sora wo Koe
Password is 0
Toki wo Koe Sora wo Koe (instrumental)
Password is 0 (instrumental)

DVD (limited edition A)
Toki wo Koe Sora wo Koe (music video)

DVD (limited edition B)
Password is 0 (music video)

DVD (limited edition C)
Toki wo Koe Sora wo Koe (dance shot ver.)

DVD (limited edition D)
Password is 0 (dance shot ver.)
Password is 0 (Morimusu special movie)

Members at time of single 
6th generation: Sayumi Michishige
9th generation: Mizuki Fukumura, Erina Ikuta, Riho Sayashi, Kanon Suzuki
10th generation: Haruna Iikubo, Ayumi Ishida, Masaki Sato, Haruka Kudo
11th generation: Sakura Oda

Toki wo Koe Sora wo Koe Vocalists

Main Voc:  Sayumi Michishige,

Minor Voc: Mizuki Fukumura, Erina Ikuta, Riho Sayashi, Kanon Suzuki, Haruna Iikubo, Ayumi Ishida, Masaki Sato, Haruka Kudo, Sakura Oda

Password is 0 Vocalists

Main Voc: Riho Sayashi, Sakura Oda

Center Voc:   Masaki Sato

Minor Voc: Sayumi Michishige, Mizuki Fukumura, Erina Ikuta, Kanon Suzuki, Haruna Iikubo, Ayumi Ishida, Haruka Kudo

Charts

Oricon charts

References

2014 singles
2014 songs
Morning Musume songs
Zetima Records singles
Oricon Weekly number-one singles
Electronic dance music songs